In linear programming, a discipline within applied mathematics, a basic solution is any solution of a linear programming problem satisfying certain specified technical conditions.

For a polyhedron  and a vector ,  is a basic solution if:
 All the equality constraints defining  are active at 
 Of all the constraints that are active at that vector, at least  of them must be linearly independent. Note that this also means that at least  constraints must be active at that vector.

A constraint is active for a particular solution  if it is satisfied at equality for that solution.

A basic solution that satisfies all the constraints defining  (or, in other words, one that lies within ) is called a basic feasible solution.

References

Linear programming